"Lollipop" is a pop song written by Julius Dixson and Beverly Ross in 1958. It was first recorded by the duo Ronald & Ruby – the writer of the song, Ross herself, was "Ruby". It was covered more successfully by The Chordettes whose version reached No. 2 in the US, and The Mudlarks in the UK.

Origins
The song originated when Julius Dixson was late for a songwriting session with Beverly Ross. He explained that his daughter had gotten a lollipop stuck in her hair, and that had caused him to be late. Ross was so inspired by the word "lollipop" that she sat down at the piano and produced a version of the song on the spot. Beverly Ross recorded a demo  with Ronald Gumm (or Gumps), a 13-year-old neighbor of Dixson, under the name Ronald & Ruby. Ross's mother insisted that she use a pseudonym for safety reasons, because they were an interracial duo.

RCA got hold of it and Dixson, who owned the master and had produced the demo, agreed to let them release it. Ronald and Ruby's version rose up the chart, reaching No. 20.

The Chordettes version

"Lollipop" was then covered in the United States by female vocal quartet The Chordettes. The Chordettes' version featured the sounds of rhythmic hand claps heard at the beginning, and a distinctive popping sound created by one of the Chordettes putting her finger into the mouth and flicked out. Their version featured also a male chorus singing the "Boom Booms", following the isolated popping sounds.  The Chordettes version reached No. 2 and No. 3 on the Billboard pop and R&B charts, respectively. The song became a worldwide hit. The Chordettes' version reached No. 6 in the UK, which is their highest charting song in the UK.

Charts

Other versions
A cover version by The Mudlarks was released in the UK and it reached No. 2 on the UK chart. The Mudlarks version also features an isolated mouth popping sound.  
Another version of the song was recorded by Bobby Vee in 1961 and included on his, Bobby Vee: Sings Hits of the Rockin' '50's.
The Argentine band Viuda e hijas de Roque Enroll had a hit in the mid-1980s using interpolations of the two most popular "Lollipop" songs: the Dixson and Ross version, and "My Boy Lollipop". Samples of the original Ronald and Ruby version were also used.
The song has been recorded by many other musicians.

See also
 List of 1950s one-hit wonders in the United States

Notes and references

Doo-wop songs
1958 debut singles
Songs written by Beverly Ross
1958 songs
The Chordettes songs
Cadence Records singles
RCA Records singles
American pop songs